Juan Vergara might refer to:

Juan Pablo Vergara (1985–2019), Peruvian footballer
Juan de Vergara (1492–1557), Spanish humanist
Juan José Gurruchaga Vergara (born 1977), Chilean actor